Terres de l'Ebre (literally in English 'The Ebre Lands') is one of the seven territories defined by the Regional Plan of Catalonia. It is located in the south-west of Catalonia, in the southern part of river Ebre, and will be formed by four comarques: Baix Ebre, Montsià, Terra Alta and Ribera d'Ebre.

The northern coastal limit of the territory is marked by the Coll de Balaguer, a natural limit with the Camp de Tarragona.

It is a UNESCO Biosphere Reserve since 2013 being the second territory in Catalonia to be awarded with this recognition, the first one being the Montseny Massif.

See also
Ilercavonia

References

Geography of Catalonia
Functional territorial sections of Catalonia